Jardine Engineering Corporation (JEC) is a private limited company and wholly owned subsidiary of the Jardine Pacific, a member of Jardine Matheson Holdings Limited. Originally established in Shanghai in 1923 to support the group’s engineering operations in China. Previously, this had been done by the group's engineering department.

Offices have been established in the Mainland China, Hong Kong, Macau, Myanmar, Thailand, Singapore and the Philippines.

The company now employs more than 4,000 staff across the Asia Pacific region; a third of these staff are working in Hong Kong where JEC has its headquarters and the remainder work from other offices in Asia. The JEC headquarters is in Manulife Financial Centre, Kwun Tong, which housed three main business units (Electrical and Mechanical Contracting, Maintenance and Renovation and Building Equipment and Products), finance, IT, administration, EHS and human capital and communications.

Notable projects
JEC has been involved in the construction of various major projects in Hong Kong and around the region.

Electrical and mechanical related
 HKIA Baggage Handling Systems
 Hong Kong Harbour Area Treatment Scheme (HATS)
 MTR's Airport Express and Tung Chung lines platform screen doors
 MTR's Siu Ho Wan, Wong Chuk Hang Depot Equipment
 MTR's Ma On Shan Railway Extension
 HACTL's SuperTerminal 1 at Chek Lap Kok, Hong Kong
 T. Park, Hong Kong's First Self-Sustaining Sludge Treatment Facility
 City of Dreams-Manila in the Philippines
 BITEC 2 in Bangkok
 Bangkok MRT Blue Line and Red Line

Service related
 Two IFC MVAC
 Tamar Government Headquarters
 The Link Operation and Maintenance
 Main Contract Works for Data Centre in Hong Kong
 Hongkong Land's Grade A Properties 
 HKIA North Satellite Concourse and Midfield Development
 Jones Lang Lasalle in the Philippines
 Ayala Property Management Corporation in the Philippines

Building technologies related
 Tung Chung Super-Oxygenation System (Hong Kong’s first Super-oxygenation system at the Tung Chung Sewage Pumping Station)
 Lo Wu Correctional Institute
 Stonecutters Bridge
 Kowloon Hospital Solar-Wind Turbine System
 Hong Kong Science Park Green Building Technologies
 Chek Lap Kok Fire Station PV Power
 Cheung Sha Wan Sewage Pumping Station PV

External links 
 Official website
 JEC - Jardine Matheson Group Companies 
 Jardine Matheson Business Units Graduate Schemes

Engineering companies of Hong Kong